Note: This compilation includes only those attacks on Israelis that resulted in casualties and no Palestinian deaths are recorded. Numerous other attacks which failed to kill, maim, or wound are not included.

Timeline

January
January 23: Mordehai Dayan, 27, & Etgar Zeitouny, 34, both of Tel Aviv, were abducted from a restaurant where they had been eating and shot to death in Tul Karem.
January 29: an Israeli killed in a drive-by shooting north of Jerusalem.

May
May 1: Assaf Hershkovitz, a  resident of the Jewish settlement of Ofra, is killed by gunfire while driving.  Giv'at Asaf was established near the site of his murder, in his memory.
May 9: two 14-year settler boys Koby Mandell and Yosef Ishran were stoned to death.
May 18: 5 Israelis killed in a suicide bombing in Netanya. Over 100 are wounded, Hamas claimed responsibility. An Israeli soldier off-duty is killed by gunfire while driving.

June
June 1: Dolphinarium massacre: 21 Israeli young people murdered and over 120 wounded by a Hamas militant suicide bombing at a disco near the Dolphinarium in Tel Aviv.
June 5: Infant Yehuda Shoham was critically injured in an Arab stone-throwing attack near his home in Shiloh. The baby died of his injuries.
June 12: Murder of Georgios Tsibouktzakis: Greek Orthodox churchman is murdered in an Arab drive-by shooting on the Maaleh Adumim road.
June 28: a woman murdered and another injured in a drive-by shooting.

August
August 9: 15 people die and 130 are injured in the Sbarro restaurant suicide bombing in Jerusalem. Both Hamas and Islamic Jihad claim responsibility. An Israeli student killed in a shooting attack north of the West Bank.

October
October 17: Israeli Tourism Minister Rehavam Zeevi is assassinated by the PFLP.

November
November 4: two Israeli teenagers killed when fire opened by a Palestinian gunman in Jerusalem. 45 people are injured.
November 29: 3 people are killed and 9 wounded in a suicide bombing of a bus near Hadera. Both Islamic Jihad and Fatah claimed responsibility. A soldier is killed and another wounded in a shooting incident on the Green Line.

See also
Israel-Gaza conflict

References

External links
 Chronology of Terrorist Attacks in Israel - Part V: 2001, Johnston Archive
 Casualties of War: 2001, Jerusalem Post

2001 in Israel
2001 in the Palestinian territories
Israeli-Palestinian conflict
2001
2001
2001
Terrorist incidents in Israel in 2001
2001